Alfred F. "Alf" Meakin (born August 30, 1938) is a retired track and field athlete.

Athletics career
He represented Great Britain in the men's 100 metres at the 1964 Summer Olympics in Tokyo, Japan.

He won the bronze medal in the men's 4 × 100 meters  relay at the 1962 European Athletics Championships in Belgrade, Yugoslavia, alongside Ron Jones, Berwyn Jones, and David Jones.

He represented England and won a gold medal in the 4 x 110 yards relay with Peter Radford, Len Carter and David Jones, at the 1962 British Empire and Commonwealth Games in Perth, Western Australia.

References

 British Olympic Committee

1938 births
Living people
Place of birth missing (living people)
British male sprinters
English male sprinters
Olympic athletes of Great Britain
Athletes (track and field) at the 1964 Summer Olympics
Commonwealth Games medallists in athletics
Commonwealth Games gold medallists for England
Athletes (track and field) at the 1962 British Empire and Commonwealth Games
European Athletics Championships medalists
Members of Thames Valley Harriers
Medallists at the 1962 British Empire and Commonwealth Games